Circassian Americans are Americans of ethnic Circassian origin. The term "Circassian Americans" can refer to ethnic Circassian immigrants to the United States, as well as their American-born descendants. Most trace their roots to Circassians in Syria and Circassians in Turkey, however, there are also those who descend from Circassians in Jordan and other areas of the Circassian diaspora. They mostly live in Upstate New York, California, and New Jersey and number around 25,000. There is also a Circassian community in Canada.

History 
Circassians in the United States all share their common ancestry in Circassia. However, there has been different waves of migrations originating from different regions. There are Circassians in the United States who originate from Turkish Circassians, while some originate from Jordanian Circassians or Syrian Circassians. There are also those whose ancestors directly migrated to the U.S. after the Circassian genocide.

Ottoman Circassians arrive in the U.S. 
Before the end of the Russo-Circassian War in 1864, a mass deportation was launched against the remaining population who survived the Circassian genocide. Calculations including those taking into account the Russian imperial government's own archival figures have estimated a loss of 95–97% of the Circassian nation in the process. The displaced people were settled primarily to the Ottoman Empire.

Circassians who were exiled to Ottoman lands initially suffered heavy tolls. Ottoman archives show nearly 1 million migrants entering their land from the Caucasus by 1879, with nearly half of them dying on the shores as a result of diseases. If Ottoman archives are correct, it would make it the biggest exile of the 19th century. The Circassians were initially housed in schools and mosques or had to live in caves until their resettlement. The Ottoman authorities assigned lands for Circassian settlers close to regular water sources and grain fields. Numerous died in transit to their new homes from disease and poor conditions. As such, many sought new homes.

Significant waves of Ottoman immigration to the United States began during the period between 1820 and 1920. About 300,000 people immigrated from the Ottoman Empire to the United States, and part of them were Circassian. Many Muslim Circassians, who had survived the Circassian genocide perpetrated by the Christian Russian Empire, just like other Muslims, feared that they would not be accepted in a Christian country and would be discriminated against. This resulted in them hiding their Islamic faith (Taqiyya) and pretending to be Christian at the port of entry to gain easy access to the United States; moreover, many declared themselves as "Armenians" to avoid discrimination.

Middle Eastern Circassians arrive in the U.S. 
Other Circassians in the Middle East, like in Syria and Jordan, were motivated to pursue the American Dream of economic success. Immigrants returning after making money in the United States inspired further waves of immigrants. Many settlers also sent for their relatives. The Jordanian and Syrian Circassian communities in the U.S. grew even larger after the Six-Day War of 1967.

Notable individuals 

 Mehmet Öz – television personality, cardiothoracic surgeon, Columbia University professor, and author 
 Caner Dagli – Islamic scholar and associate professor of Religious Studies at the College of the Holy Cross in Worcester, Massachusetts 
 Daphne Öz – New York Times Bestselling nutrition author, chef, and Emmy Award Winning television host 
 Nadine Jolie Courtney – lifestyle writer, novelist, and former media personality 
 Emanne Beasha – singer. She is the winner of the fifth season of the program Arabs Got Talent and finished in 9th place on fourteenth Season of America's Got Talent 
Derya Arbaş – actress

References

Works cited
 
 .
 
 

Circassian diaspora
Ethnic groups in the United States
Immigration to the United States
Middle Eastern American
American people of Circassian descent